Cross Country is an automobile model name that was applied to station wagon versions of the:

 AMC Ambassador, model years: 1958 to 1968 
 AMC Rebel, model years: 1967 to 1968
 Nash Rambler, model years: 1954 to 1955
 Rambler Classic, model years: 1961 to 1966
 Rambler Six and V8, model years: 1956 to 1960